Carne de chango (Spanish for "monkey meat") is a lime-marinated, smoke-cured cut of pork loin principally seen in the Catemaco region of the state of Veracruz in Mexico.

The switch from monkey meat to pork meat arose from the hunting to the edge of extinction of the two monkey species resident in the Sierra de Los Tuxtlas.

References

Los Tuxtlas
Mexican cuisine
Pork dishes